The 1984 Ebel German Open was a men's tennis tournament played on outdoor clay courts at Am Rothenbaum in Hamburg, West Germany that was part of the 1984 Grand Prix circuit. It was the 76th edition of the event and took place from 7 May through 13 May 1984. Unseeded Juan Aguilera won the singles title.

Finals

Singles

 Juan Aguilera defeated  Henrik Sundström, 6–4, 2–6, 2–6, 6–4, 6–4
 It was Aguilera's 2nd singles title of the year and of his career.

Doubles

 Stefan Edberg /  Anders Järryd defeated  Heinz Günthardt /  Balázs Taróczy, 6–3, 6–1

References

External links
   
 ATP tournament profile
 ITF tournament edition details

German Open
Hamburg European Open
1984 in West German sport
German